The Battle of Abu Kru (also known as the Battle of Gubat) was part of the British Sudan campaign.  It was fought on 19 January 1885, two days after the Battle of Abu Klea, between the British and the Mahdists.  The British force under General Sir Herbert Stewart numbered 1,200 while a large number of Mahdists, probably around 13–14,000 were in pursuit.

The British were moving to rescue General Gordon from Khartoum, and were cutting the Great Bend of the Nile, when they came under attack a short distance from rejoining the Nile.  The British formed a square, and continued moving towards the Nile, repelling all attacks until they reached the river.  The British losses were 121, including Stewart, who had been fatally wounded at the previous day's battle at Abu Klea.  The Mahdist losses are unknown but thought to be considerably higher.

References

External links

1885 in Sudan
Conflicts in 1885
Battles of the Mahdist War
January 1885 events